Muslihittin Peykoğlu (20 October 1905 – 27 December 1960) was a Turkish footballer who represented his nation at the 1928 Summer Olympics in the Netherlands.

Career statistics

International

International goals
Scores and results list Turkey's goal tally first.

References

1905 births
1960 deaths
Turkish footballers
Turkey international footballers
Association football forwards
Footballers at the 1924 Summer Olympics
Footballers at the 1928 Summer Olympics
Olympic footballers of Turkey